The individual dressage event at the 2020 Summer Olympics took place from 24 to 28 July 2021 at the Baji Koen. Like all other equestrian events, the dressage competition is open-gender, with both male and female athletes competing in the same division. 60 riders from 30 nations are expected to compete.

Background

This was the 25th appearance of the event, which has been held at every Summer Olympics since 1912.

The two-time reigning Olympic champion is Charlotte Dujardin of Great Britain (riding Valegro). The reigning (2018) World Champion is Isabell Werth of Germany.

An Olympics.com preview of equestrian (all events) provided the following overview:

Qualification

A National Olympic Committee (NOC) could enter up to 3 qualified riders in the individual dressage. Quota places are allocated to the NOC, which selects the riders. There were 60 quota places available, allocated as follows:

 Team members (45 places): Each of the 15 NOCs qualified in the team dressage event entered its 3 team members in the individual dressage event.
 Ranking (15 places): The top 2 riders (1 per NOC, and excluding NOCs with qualified teams) in each of the 7 geographic regions were to receive a quota places, with one final quota place based on rankings regardless of geographic region. The two Americas regions were combined. A withdrawal by Norway resulted in one of the Group A places being reallocated to the world ranking.

Competition format

The competition format has changed dramatically from prior Games. The competition has dropped from three rounds to two; moreover, advancement is now determined first by place in group rather than overall place (though there are lucky loser places available). The two rounds of the competition are the Grand Prix and the Grand Prix Freestyle.

 Grand Prix: All 60 riders compete in the Grand Prix. They are divided into 6 groups of 10; 3 groups will go on each day of the round. The top 2 riders in each group, along with the next best 6 overall, advance to the Grand Prix Freestyle. The Grand Prix is also the qualifying round for the team event.
 Grand Prix Freestyle: The 18 riders competing receive a final rank based only on the Grand Prix Freestyle score (the Grand Prix scores do not carry over).

Schedule

The event takes place on three competition days over five days, with two days for the Grand Prix followed by a rest day, the team final day, then the individual Grand Prix Freestyle.

All times are Japan Standard Time (UTC+9).

Results

Grand Prix
The top two athletes from each group, and the six athletes with the next best scores (a multi-step tiebreaker would be used for ties, finally broken by random draw) will qualify to the individual final (Grand Prix Freestyle).

Grand Prix Freestyle
The Grand Prix Freestyle was drawn in groups of 6 in reverse order of the results in the Grand Prix. For the first time at the Olympics, the FEI Degree Of Difficulty system was used: each of the riders electronically submitted a floorplan of their movements ahead of the competition and were assigned a maximum difficulty score by computer. The judges then assessed the competitors according to their unique scoresheet.

References

Individual dressage